The Hamptons: Food, Family, and History was written by Ricky Lauren in 2012. It is a cookbook that also shares the life of the Lauren family in photographs and stories.

Background
Lauren and Ralph Lauren were married in 1964 and lived in Southampton, New York in a converted barn. Then, they spent the summers on Long Island.  The Laurens had two homes in Amagansett, from which Ralph commuted into New York City, and a home in East Hampton. 

In each place that they lived, Lauren was inspired by the locale, which resulted in different recipes and ways of entertaining.

They now have a house in Montauk, on a cliff that overlooks a bird sanctuary. It is a place where she likes to entertain her friends and spend time with her children and their families. She often entertains outside.

The book

The cookbook contains recipes that Lauren has been collecting since she was married. Many of the recipes are based upon local seasonal foods. The book shares stories of her life with her husband and their children—Andrew, David, and Dylan—through anecdotes, photographs, and favorite recipes. While in East Hampton, the family lived alongside a farmer's field, and picked vegetables and fruit for their dinner. "It's full of that classic, clean, Americana style that Ralph Lauren and clan have come to symbolize," according to the Associated Press.

The book contains 130 recipes which are divided among four sections, based upon the places that they have lived on Long Island. For instance, in the East Hampton section, there are recipes for country chicken chili, cold poached salmon, and mixed berry apple and oat muffins.

In addition to recipes, the book provides ideas about entertaining, like creating a "perfect atmosphere for a barbecue". Lauren says, "The Hamptons’ is about taking advantage of the natural setting. Keep things simple, entertain outdoors, seek out fresh produce in farm markets if you can. Enjoy the unique natural beauty and bounty with friends and family wherever you live." The book also contains stories about the culture and history of the Hamptons, like its artists, authors, and architects.

Publishers Weekly says of the book, "Equally enticing [as the recipes in the book] are the snippets into the surprisingly unaffected everyday life of this famous family—e.g., a favorite meal of humble London broil, rationing out Nana’s rum-laced brownies, and the many family photos in the book. Intimate, fun, and full of tasty offerings, readers will adopt many of these recipes and make their own family memories." It also says that while the sections about where the family has lived on Long Island is meaningful to Lauren, it may be difficult for some to find recipes without reliance on the index.

References

Further reading
 
 

2012 non-fiction books
American cookbooks
The Hamptons, New York
Houghton Mifflin books
Lauren family